The 1985 World Cup took place  at the La Quinta Resort & Club in La Quinta, California, United States. It was the 32nd World Cup event. The tournament was a 72-hole stroke play team event with 31 teams, of which 15 teams were directly qualified through last years tournament. Each team consisted of two players from a country. The combined score of each team determined the team results. The Canada team of Dave Barr and Dan Halldorson won by four strokes over the England team of Howard Clark and Paul Way. The individual competition for The International Trophy, was won by Howard Clark five strokes ahead of Christy O'Connor Jnr, Ireland.

Teams

Scores 
Team

International Trophy

Sources:

References

World Cup (men's golf)
Golf in California
World Cup golf
World Cup golf
World Cup golf